The Dakota Baptist Convention (DBC) is an autonomous association of Southern Baptist churches in the U.S. states of North Dakota and South Dakota. It is one of the state conventions associated with the Southern Baptist Convention. Headquartered in Rapid City, South Dakota, the convention is made up of seven Baptist associations and around 100 churches as of 2010. DBC was created in 2003.

The organization attracted media attention for giving away a Harley Davidson motorcycle each year at the Sturgis Motorcycle Rally as part of an outreach effort. To qualify for a ticket, a rally attendee had to listen to a three-minute story of how Jesus had changed someone's life.

References

Further reading

External links
 
 

Conventions associated with the Southern Baptist Convention
Organizations based in Sioux Falls, South Dakota
Culture of Sioux Falls, South Dakota
Baptist Christianity in South Dakota
Baptist Christianity in North Dakota

Baptist denominations established in the 21st century